Amphoecini is a tribe of beetles in the subfamily Cerambycinae, containing the following genera:

 Amphoecus Montrouzier, 1861
 Cyanamphoecus Breuning, 1951

References

Cerambycinae
Polyphaga tribes